The Central Penn Business Journal is a business newspaper headquartered in Harrisburg, Pennsylvania.  The print publication is circulated on a weekly basis and covers five counties in central Pennsylvania:  Cumberland, Dauphin, Lancaster, Lebanon, and York.

It was acquired by New Media Investment Group in 2016. With a readership of more than 43,000 in print and tens of thousands more online, the Journal reaches business leaders and decision-makers who  work, live and invest in Central Pennsylvania.

Staff
The Business Journal staff reporters:

 Roger DuPuis, who covers Cumberland County, manufacturing, distribution and energy.
 David O'Connor, who covers York County, nonprofits, education and workforce.
 Michael Sadowski, who covers Lebanon County, banking and finance, law and technology.
 Jason Scott, who covers Dauphin County, state government, real estate, construction, media and marketing.
 Lenay Ruhl, who covers Lancaster County, health care and agribusiness..

See also
List of newspapers in Harrisburg
List of newspapers in Pennsylvania

References

External links
Central Penn Business Journal

Publications established in 1984
Newspapers published in Harrisburg, Pennsylvania